Varney Nunatak is an ice-free nunatak at the south side of the mouth of Harbord Glacier in Victoria Land. It was mapped by the United States Geological Survey (USGS) from surveys and U.S. Navy air photos, 1957–62, and was named by the Advisory Committee on Antarctic Names (US-ACAN) for Kenneth L. Varney, U.S. Navy, Equipment Operator at McMurdo Station during the 1965-66 and 1966-67 summer seasons.

Nunataks of Victoria Land
Scott Coast